Babis Tennes  (born 17 November 1953) is a Greek professional football manager.

Managerial career
Tennes began his professional coaching career with Kallithea in 1993 in Gamma Ethniki. After that he built up his career with Super League Greece clubs like Athinaikos, Panelefsiniakos and Kerkyra. Tennes returned to manage Kallithea in 2003. For the season 2015-'16 he was the head coach of Apollon Smyrnis, leading them to the fourth place of the Football League.

References

1953 births
Living people
Sportspeople from Athens
Greek football managers
Kallithea F.C. managers
GAS Ialysos 1948 F.C. managers
Athinaikos F.C. managers
Apollon Smyrnis F.C. managers
Kalamata F.C. managers
Paniliakos F.C. managers
Panelefsiniakos F.C. managers
Aris Thessaloniki F.C. managers
A.O. Kerkyra managers
A.P.O. Akratitos Ano Liosia managers
Levadiakos F.C. managers
Ethnikos Asteras F.C. managers
Panachaiki F.C. managers
Panetolikos F.C. managers
AEL Kalloni F.C. managers
PAS Lamia 1964 managers
Xanthi F.C. managers